Marios Tsaousis (born 11 May 2000) is a Greek professional footballer who plays as a left back for Super League club PAOK.

Career

PAOK
Tsaousis joined from Iraklis in 2010 and immediately became the leader of the Under-15 (2014-15) team, an Under-17 title-winner, and he was also crowned a champion with the Under-19 squad. He is a fast and creative left-back who can operate just as well in the position of left midfielder. He wore a first team shirt in the friendly with Doxa Drama in 2016, and then was loaned to Volos and Spartak Trnava
. He is a Greek youth international with the Under-21 team. Marios Tsaousis will remain a player of PAOK for the next three years, after as announced by Dikefalos, the 21-year-old left back renewed his contract with the team, which will be valid until December 2025. The young defender is playing for PAOK B.

References

2000 births
Living people
Footballers from Thessaloniki
Greek footballers
Greece under-21 international footballers
Greece youth international footballers
Greek expatriate footballers
Association football defenders
PAOK FC players
Volos N.F.C. players
PAOK FC B players
FC Spartak Trnava players
Super League Greece players
Super League Greece 2 players
Slovak Super Liga players
Expatriate footballers in Slovakia
Greek expatriate sportspeople in Slovakia